Jimmy Mann may refer to:
Jimmy Mann (darts player) (born 1978), English darts player
Jimmy Mann (footballer) (born 1952), English footballer
Jimmy Mann (ice hockey) (born 1959), Canadian ice hockey player

See also
James Mann (disambiguation)